Snorri Hjartarson (22 April 1906 – 27 December 1986) was an Icelandic poet, and a winner of the Nordic Council's Literature Prize.

Biography
Hjartarson was born in Hvanneyri, Borgarfjörður. He lived in Norway for a long time and studied art at the Art Academy of Oslo under the direction of Axel Revold from 1931 to 1932. His first publication was a novel written in Norwegian in 1934, but he is known for his poetry books in Icelandic. He made his national debut in 1944. Hjartarson was a librarian at the Reykjavik City Library (Borgarbókasafn Reykjavíkur) after he moved back to Iceland. From 1942-1966 he served as City Librarian, taking over the post from Sigurgeir Friðriksson. In 1981, he was awarded the Nordic Council Literature Prize for his poetry collection Hauströkkrið yfir mér.

Works
 1934 Høit flyver ravnen
 1944 Kvæði
 1945 Sol er a morgun. Kvædasafn fra atjandu öld fyrri hluta nitjandu aldar 
 1952 Á Gnitaheiði
 1966 Lauf og stjörnur
 1979 Hauströkkrið yfir mér
 1992 Kvæðasafn

References

Hjartarson, Snorri
Hjartarson, Snorri
20th-century Icelandic people
Icelandic poets
Icelandic writers
Nordic Council Literature Prize winners
20th-century Icelandic poets
Icelandic expatriates in Norway